Profil  may refer to:

La Mouette Profil, a French hang glider design
Profil (band), a French musical group
Profil (literary magazine), a Norwegian literary magazine
profil (magazine), an Austrian news magazine
 Profil (Russian magazine), a Russian general interest magazine

See also 
 Profile (disambiguation)